Athanasius III may refer to:

 Athanasius III (r. 724–739/740), Syriac Orthodox Patriarch of Antioch
 Pope Athanasius III of Alexandria (r. 1250–1261),  Coptic Orthodox Pope
 Patriarch Athanasius III of Alexandria (r. 1276–1316), Greek Patriarch of Alexandria
 Patriarch Athanasius III of Constantinople (1597–1654), twice Patriarch of Constantinople
 Athanasius III Dabbas (1647–1724), last Patriarch of Antioch before the final split of 1724 which divided the Melkite Church between the Melkite Greek Catholic Church and the Greek Orthodox Church of Antioch